The following is a list of all results of the Canada women's national soccer team.

Scorers list only the Canadian scorers.

1986–1988

1990–1999

2000–2009

2010–2019

2020–2029

External links
 All results on CanadaSoccer.com

Canada women's national soccer team
Women's national association football team results